The Man in the Iron Mask is a 1923 German silent adventure film directed by Max Glass and starring Albert Bassermann, Bruno Decarli, and Vladimir Gajdarov. It was shot at the Terra Studios in Berlin. The film's sets were designed by the art director Robert A. Dietrich.

Cast
 Albert Bassermann – Jules Mazarin
 Bruno Decarli – Gaston d'Aubigny
 Vladimir Gajdarov – Louis XIV
 Helga Molander – Etienne de Tiffanges
 Wilhelm Diegelmann – Wirt
 Ludwig Hartau
 Emil Heyse
 Joseph Klein
 Friedrich Kühne
 Leopold von Ledebur
 Lina Lossen – Anne of Austria
 Erich Pabst
 Max Ruhbeck
 Franz Schönfeld
 Hermine Sterler
 Magnus Stifter

References

Bibliography
 Buchanan, Roderick D. Playing With Fire: The Controversial Career of Hans J. Eysenck. Oxford University Press, 2010.

External links

1923 films
Films based on The Vicomte of Bragelonne: Ten Years Later
Films of the Weimar Republic
Films directed by Max Glass
German silent feature films
German black-and-white films
German adventure films
Cultural depictions of Louis XIV
Cultural depictions of Cardinal Mazarin
1923 adventure films
Terra Film films
Man in the Iron Mask
Twins in fiction
Silent adventure films
1920s German films
Films shot at Terra Studios
1920s German-language films